The name "Whitechapel Boys" identifies a loosely-knit group of Anglo-Jewish writers and artists of the early 20th century.  It is named after Whitechapel, which contained one of London's main Jewish settlements and from which many of its members came.  These members included Mark Gertler, Isaac Rosenberg, David Bomberg, Joseph Leftwich, Jacob Kramer, Morris Goldstein, Stephen Winsten, John Rodker, Lazarus Aaronson and its only female member, Clara Birnberg.

The name originates later in the 20th century, and was not used at the time the group was active.

Several of the Whitechapel Boys, such as Rodker, Rosenberg, Leftwich, Winsten and Bomberg, were also politically active and members of the radical Young Socialist League.

References

External links
 Whitechapel at War: Isaac Rosenberg and his Circle - an exhibition at the Ben Uri Gallery, part of a series of exhibitions on the Whitechapel Boys
 Review of the exhibition

 
Jewish literature
Jewish art
Jewish English history
British artist groups and collectives
Cultural history of the United Kingdom
Culture in London
English art
Literary circles
20th-century British literature